The Ako-Adjei Interchange is a flyover in Accra, Ghana. Until 2005 it was known as the Sankara Interchange. The construction of interchange started in September 1997 and ended in December 1999. It was constructed during the Jerry Rawlings administration and was the first interchange to be built in Ghana.

Location
The interchange is located between Ring Road Central and Independence Avenue and is along Liberation Road in Accra with links towards the 37 Military Hospital, the Police headquarters.

History
The site of the interchange was prior to its construction a major roundabout. The roundabout had several name changes from the Akuafo Roundabout to Redemption Circle to the Sankara Circle. The names given to the roundabout represented the identities and interests of various Ghanaian political leader in Ghana's political history. When construction of the interchange begun in 1997 it was to replace the Sankara Roundabout. Upon completion the interchange was named the Sankara Interchange. Captain Thomas Sankara was a military ruler of Burkina Faso.

Renaming
The interchange was renamed after Dr. Ebenezer Ako Adjei, who was a lawyer and founding member of the United Gold Coast Convention (UGCC).

References

Accra
Roads in Ghana
Road interchanges in Ghana